Mark Joseph Lewis (born May 5, 1961) is a former professional American football tight end in the National Football League. He played four seasons for the Green Bay Packers and the Detroit Lions.

External links
Just Sports Stats

1961 births
Living people
Players of American football from Houston
American football tight ends
Texas A&M Aggies football players
Green Bay Packers players
Detroit Lions players